Wolf Summit is a census-designated place and coal town in Harrison County, West Virginia, United States. Its population was 272 as of the 2010 census.

The community was named after the surname Wolf and its being the highest point on the railroad between Grafton and Parkersburg.

References

Census-designated places in Harrison County, West Virginia
Census-designated places in West Virginia
Coal towns in West Virginia